Greenhalgh's Football Club was a 19th-century English football club based Mansfield, Nottinghamshire.

History
The club was a member of the Midland League for the 1893–94 season, finishing 5th out of 11. In the summer of 1894 the club joined forces with their rivals Mansfield Town (not connected to the current club) to form Mansfield FC.

References

Defunct football clubs in Nottinghamshire
Association football clubs disestablished in 1894
Association football clubs established in the 19th century
Midland Football League (1889)
Works association football teams in England
Sport in Mansfield